The Museo del Jade is an archaeological museum in San José, Costa Rica. Since 2014, it has been located in front of Plaza de la Democracia. It was founded in 1977 by Fidel Tristán Castro, the first president of the INS. The museum contains the world's largest collection of American jade.

Gallery

See also 
 List of museums in Costa Rica
 Museo Nacional de Costa Rica
 Museo del Oro Precolombino

References

External links 
 Further information 

Museums in San José, Costa Rica
Museums established in 1977
Mesoamerican art museums
Pre-Columbian art museums
Museo del Jade